Christopher William Hajt (born July 5, 1978) is a Canadian-born American former ice hockey defenceman. He played 6 games in the National Hockey League (NHL) with the Edmonton Oilers and Washington Capitals during the 2000–01 and 2003–04 seasons. The rest of his career, which lasted from 1998 to 2008, was mainly spent in the minor leagues. After his playing career Hajt became a coach, and has been an Assistant Coach with the Ontario Reign of the American Hockey League since 2019. Hajt's father, Bill Hajt, also played in the NHL.

Career 
Born in Saskatoon, Saskatchewan and raised in Amherst, New York when his father, Bill Hajt was a member of the Buffalo Sabres. He attended Williamsville North High School and graduated in 1996. Hajt was drafted by the Edmonton Oilers in the second round, 32nd overall in the 1996 NHL Entry Draft after playing junior hockey with the Guelph Storm of the Ontario Hockey League (OHL). He became an excellent defenseman in his junior career with the Storm. Hajt spent time in the National Hockey League, playing in six games, one with the Oilers during the 2000–2001 season, the other five with the Washington Capitals in the 2003–2004 season, and did not record a point in the NHL.

Hajt played for Hockey Club Bolzano-Bozen of the Italian Serie A in 2007, before retiring in May 2008.

Coaching career 
Hajt worked as an assistant coach with the Guelph Storm of the OHL from 2008 to 2014. In the 2014–15 AHL season, he was the assistant coach of the Manchester Monarchs. From 2015 to 2017, he served as the assistant coach of the Ontario Reign serving under Mike Stothers.

From 2017 to 2019, he served as the assistant coach of the Buffalo Sabres.  Hajt returned to the Ontario Reign of the AHL on June 25, 2019.

Career statistics

Regular season and playoffs

International

References

External links 
 

1978 births
Living people
American men's ice hockey defensemen
American people of Slovenian descent
Bolzano HC players
Buffalo Sabres coaches
Edmonton Oilers draft picks
Edmonton Oilers players
Füchse Duisburg players
Guelph Storm players
Hamilton Bulldogs (AHL) players
Ice hockey people from New York (state)
Lukko players
People from Amherst, New York
Portland Pirates players
Sportspeople from Saskatoon
Washington Capitals players